Parphorus is a genus of skippers in the family Hesperiidae.

Species
Recognised species in the genus Parphorus include:
 Parphorus decora Dyar, 1914
 Parphorus felta Evans, [1955]
 Parphorus storax (Draudt, 1923)

Former species
Parphorus auristriga Bell, 1959 - transferred to Rigga auristriga (Bell, 1959)
Parphorus hesia (Hewitson, 1870) - transferred to Rigga hesia (Hewitson, 1870)
Parphorus ira (Butler, 1870) - transferred to Rigga ira (Butler, 1870)
Parphorus oeagrus (Godman, [1900]) - transferred to Rigga oeagrus (Godman, [1900])
Parphorus paramus (Bell, 1947) - transferred to Rigga paramus (Bell, 1947)
Parphorus sapala (Godman, [1900]) - transferred to Rigga sapala (Godman, [1900])

References

External links
Natural History Museum Lepidoptera genus database

Hesperiinae
Hesperiidae genera